Turab Tula (Тураб Тула), pseudonym of Turab Tulakhozhaev (Тураб Тулахожаев) (1918—1990) was a Soviet Uzbek writer, People's Writer of the Uzbek SSR.

1918 births
1990 deaths
Uzbekistani writers
Soviet writers
Uzbeks